Oxford Sciences Enterprises is an early-stage venture capital firm with over $800M in AUM based in Oxford, UK. It operates in partnership with the University of Oxford, as the university's preferred investor, several prominent financiers back the firm, including Google Ventures, Sequoia Capital, Tencent, Huawei and Invesco. The firm uses academic research from the university's science departments to form commercial businesses, also known as spin-outs.

Founding & Management
The company was founded in 2015 by David Norwood, who was previously the founder of the IP Group, which initially invested only in spinoffs from the university's chemistry department. Oxford Sciences Enterprises initially raised £600m from investors, which included Lansdowne Partners and Google Ventures. Google Ventures partners Tom Hulme and Dr Krishna Yeshwant also joined OSI's advisory board, along with Google AI researcher Demis Hassabis, founder of DeepMind.

Charles Conn, previously CEO of the Rhodes Trust and former McKinsey partner, was appointed CEO in March 2019. Former Google CFO Patrick Pichette joined him as Chair of the board. However, Conn departed in November 2019 and Pichette shortly after. OSI's CFO became acting CEO until the appointment of Alexis Dormandy, another former McKinsey partner, in October 2020

Structure 
OSE is structured differently from other venture capital firms, being an evergreen patient capital, privately held company and not bound by an LPA . As such, the company holds long-term investments, pursuing a patient capital model. OSI differentiates itself from classic venture firms because of its relationship with the university. Unlike most university-linked venture firms, Oxford University is a shareholder in the company, with OSI receiving half of the university's stake in the intellectual property of a spinout.

OSE works with the university's technology transfer office, Oxford University Innovation, which helps manage the intellectual property and patent estate of the university.

In July 2019, The company announced an investment from Chinese telecommunications company Huawei owns £4.1m in OSI shares (approximately 0.7% of the total fund).

References 

Venture capital firms of the United Kingdom
Companies based in Oxford
British companies established in 2015